In game theory, a game is said to be a potential game if the incentive of all players to change their strategy can be expressed using a single global function called the potential function. The concept originated in a 1996 paper by Dov Monderer and Lloyd Shapley.

The properties of several types of potential games have since been studied. Games can be either ordinal or cardinal potential games. In cardinal games, the difference in individual payoffs for each player from individually changing one's strategy, other things equal, has to have the same value as the difference in values for the potential function. In ordinal games, only the signs of the differences have to be the same.

The potential function is a useful tool to analyze equilibrium properties of games, since the incentives of all players are mapped into one function, and the set of pure Nash equilibria can be found by locating the local optima of the potential function. Convergence and finite-time convergence of an iterated game towards a Nash equilibrium can also be understood by studying the potential function.

Potential games can be studied as repeated games with state so that every round played has a direct consequence on game's state in the next round. This approach has applications in distributed control such as distributed resource allocation, where players without a central correlation mechanism can cooperate to achieve a globally optimal resource distribution.

Definition
We will define some notation required for the definition. Let  be the number of players,  the set of action profiles over the action sets  of each player and  be the payoff function.
 
A game  is:

 an exact potential game if there is a function  such that ,

That is: when player  switches from action  to action ,  the change in the potential equals the change in the utility of that player.

 a weighted potential game if there is a function  and a vector  such that ,

 an ordinal potential game if there is a function  such that ,

 a generalized ordinal potential game if there is a function  such that ,

a best-response potential game if there is a function  such that ,

where  is the best action for player  given .

A simple example

In a 2-player, 2-action game with externalities, individual players' payoffs are given by the function , where  is players i's action,  is the opponent's action, and w is a positive externality from choosing the same action. The action choices are +1 and −1, as seen in the payoff matrix in Figure 1.

This game has a potential function .

The solution for player 2 is equivalent. These are also the local maxima of the potential function (Figure 3).

A 2-player, 2-action game cannot be a potential game unless

See also
 Congestion game
 Econophysics

References

External links
 Lecture notes of Yishay Mansour about Potential and congestion games
 Section 19 in: 
 Non technical exposition by Huw Dixon of the inevitability of collusion Chapter 8, Donut world and the duopoly archipelago,Surfing Economics.

Game theory game classes